Guanine nucleotide-binding protein subunit alpha-15 is a protein that in humans is encoded by the GNA15 gene. G15α is a member of the Gq alpha subunit family, and functions as a constituent of a heterotrimeric G protein in cell signal transduction. It was also previously known as G16α.

See also
 Gq alpha subunit
 Heterotrimeric G protein

References